Pipe Aston is a small village and civil parish in the far north of Herefordshire, close to the border with Shropshire. It has a population of about 24.

It is situated on the Wigmore to Ludlow road. National Cycle Network route 44 passes through, en route between Ludlow and Leominster. The village is just north of Elton. Mortimer Forest is in the vicinity and the High Vinnalls hill is in the parish.

The village features the 12th century St Giles parish church.

References

External links

Villages in Herefordshire
Civil parishes in Herefordshire